Boonville is a novel by Robert Mailer Anderson. It was published by Creative Arts Book Company (in association with Zyzzyva magazine, as a "Zyzzyva First Novel") in 2001, then reprinted by HarperCollins in 2003. It is a San Francisco Chronicle Best Seller and was called one of the "Top 10 Literary Events of 2001."

Accolades
"It's the funniest first novel by an American writer to come my way since John Kennedy Toole's A Confederacy of Dunces." -Jonathan Yardley, Washington Post

"A sardonic and beautifully imagined first novel...pages of well-tuned humor...[with] an exemplary eye for emotional detail." -San Francisco Weekly

"A brilliant new voice-twitchy, corny, sly, cackling, and sad, but most of all, racing with vitality and goosing you to keep up. Boonville is the creepy and hilarious coming-of-age story the territory deserves-not your parents' Vineland, but your own." -Jonathan Lethem

"A very sick man-and a very funny writer." -Carl Hiaasen

Synopsis
The novel tells the story of John Gibson, as he breaks up with his girlfriend and leaves Miami, Florida to move to the small town of Boonville, California, where he meets the resident of a commune, Sarah McKay. The book portrays the town in an often comedic manner, bringing to life a number of colorful Mendocino County residents including hippies, rednecks, feminists, and commercial marijuana cultivation.

Author comments
Anderson states in the book's preface, "So, any of the local residents who can read, and do read this novel, and take offense at the descriptions or content, instead of sucker-punching me while I'm in town trying to buy groceries with my wife and son, let me just buy you a drink and we'll call it even. As for the hippies in the county who may be upset at the depiction of hippies, I say, 'Tough shit, hippie.'"

References

2001 American novels
Mendocino County, California
Novels set in California